Sleight is a 2016 American science fiction drama film.

Sleight may refer to:

 George Sleight (1853–1921), English trawler owner
 Karl J. Sleight (born 1962), US attorney
 Rebecca Sleight (born 1974), English singer who performs under the stage name Berri

See also
 Sleight of hand, referring to fine motor skills used by magicians and others
 Slight (disambiguation)